James Bertie Tumilty (29 June 1886 – 28 August 1953) was an Australian rules footballer who played with Carlton in the Victorian Football League (VFL).

He was born in Launceston, Tasmania on 29 June 1886. In 1915 he enlisted in the Australian Imperial Force and fought in the Gallipoli Campaign. He returned home after being injured by poison gas.

Notes

External links 

Jim Tumilty's profile at Blueseum

1886 births
Australian rules footballers from Tasmania
Carlton Football Club players
1953 deaths
Australian military personnel of World War I